Cochylis amoenana is a species of moth of the family Tortricidae. It is found in Iran, Pakistan, Central Asia, Afghanistan, Tajikistan and Kyrgyzstan.

References

Moths described in 1899
Cochylis